The dominant religion in Slovenia is Christianity, primarily the Catholic Church, which is the largest Christian denomination in the country. Other Christian groups having significant followings in the country include Eastern Orthodoxy and Protestantism (Lutheranism). Islam, Judaism and Hinduism are small minorities in Slovenia. About 18% of the population are either agnostic or atheist.

Religion played a significant role in the development of the  Slovenian nation and of the country of Slovenia. After a centuries-long tradition of a state church, interrupted by the periods of Protestant Reformation (in the 16th century) and post–World War II socialism (which ousted religion from the public life), a degree of separation of the state and the church has been reached in independent Slovenia. In February 2007 Slovenia passed a new Religious Freedom Act with a bias towards the Catholic Church (particularly in regard to state funding) and strict terms for the registration of new religious communities.

Religion and Beliefs

Christianity

Catholicism

The Catholic Church in Slovenia is part of the worldwide Catholic Church, under the spiritual leadership of the Pope in Rome.

There are around 1,135,626 Catholics in the country (about 57.8% of the total population as per the 2002 Census). The country is divided into six dioceses, including two archdioceses. The diocese of Maribor was elevated to an archdiocese by Pope Benedict XVI in 2006. Additionally, the pope created three new sees, namely Novo Mesto, Celje and Murska Sobota.

Protestantism
Protestantism is tightly-knit with the history of Slovenians, with the Slovenian language having been established in the Reformation. Primož Trubar was a leading early Slovenian author and a Protestant reformer. He contributed to the development of the Slovenian language and Slovenian culture.

The Reformation flourished in the 16th century, accounting for the vast majority of cultural development in Slovenian. Lutheranism was the most popular Protestant denomination among Slovenians, with minorities, most notably Calvinism.

Protestantism among Slovenians was aggressively attempted to be wiped out by the Habsburgs with the Counter-Reformation. The Counter-Reformation was heavily deployed to the majority of Slovenian-speaking territory. Means used involved murder, extradition, book-burning and a general ban of the Slovenian language. Excluded were eastern regions (such as Prekmurje), ruled by Hungarian nobility, often Calvinist. Historically, Hungarians had taken up Lutheranism first, before gradually switching to Calvinism. They did not have a policy of extinguishing Lutheranism.

Protestantism among Slovenians survived the Counter-Reformation scattered. Protestantism is a minority group of Christian denominations in the Republic of Slovenia today. The largest community of Protestant Slovenians lives in the Prekmurje region, most of them are Lutheran.

Eastern Orthodoxy
Eastern Orthodoxy maintains a significant presence in the country and is practised in majority by Slovenians of Serbian heritage. Eastern Orthodox Christians in Slovenia are under ecclesiastical jurisdiction of the Serbian Orthodox Metropolitanate of Zagreb and Ljubljana.

Islam

The Muslims in Slovenia are ethnically mostly Bosniaks and ethnic Muslims. In 2014, there were 48,266 Muslims in Slovenia, making up about 2.4 percent of the total population.

According to the published data from the 2002 Slovenian census, out of a total of 47,488 Muslims (2.4% of the total population) 2,804 Muslims (5.90% of the total Muslims in Slovenia) declared themselves as ethnic Slovenian Muslims.

There are also Muslims from Central, South and Southeast Asia, who are not counted in the census because they are migrant workers.

Judaism

The small Jewish community of Slovenia is estimated at 400 to 600 members, with the Jewish community of Slovenia suggesting 500 to 1000 members. Around 130 are officially registered, most of whom live in the capital, Ljubljana. The Jewish community was devastated by the Shoah, and has never fully recovered. Until 2003, Ljubljana was the only European capital city without a Jewish place of worship.

Hinduism

220 Hindus live in Slovenia, with 70 belonging to the Hindu Religious Community in Slovenia and 150 belonging to the International Society for Krishna Consciousness (Iskcon).

Atheism
A 2010 Eurobarometer poll found that 26% of the population of Slovenia stated that "I don't believe there is any sort of spirit, God or life force".
A 2021 World Population Review found that 53% of Slovenians were either non-religious or convinced atheist.

Demographics

Censuses
Religiosity of Slovene citizens according to population censuses 1991, and 2002.

Surveys
 Eurobarometer 2012 found about 68% of the population declaring to be Christian, with 64% being members of the Catholic Church. Members of other Christian denominations made up 4% of the population.
 International Social Survey Programme 2015 found that 64.3% of the population declared to be Christian, with Catholicism being the largest denomination accounting for 62.2% of the respondents, and Eastern Orthodoxy being the second-largest sect comprising 1.5%; members of other Christian denominations made up the 0.6%. A further 34.3% declared to have no religion, and 1.5% declared to belong to other religions.

Religious freedom 

Slovenia's laws guarantee the freedom of religion and establish a separation between church and state, as well as prohibiting religious discrimination and religious hatred. Religious groups may easily register with the government in order to receive some privileges, largely consisting of various forms of monetary compensation.

Slovenia's laws prohibit circumcision for non-medical reasons and animal slaughtering practices that are necessary for meat to be considered kosher or halal. Members of the Jewish and Muslim communities observe these practices outside of the country (importing meat, and traveling to neighboring countries for religious circumcision) without obstruction from Slovenia's government.

See also
Catholic Church in Slovenia
Islam in Slovenia
History of the Jews in Slovenia
Hinduism in Slovenia
Demographics of Slovenia

References

External links